St Ives South was an electoral division of Cornwall in the United Kingdom which returned one member to sit on Cornwall Council from 2009 to 2013. The sole Councillor was Joan Symons, a Conservative.

The division covered 1,576 hectares in total. It was abolished by the Cornwall (Electoral Changes) Order 2011, and Symons went on to contest the St Ives East division. She lost re-election, being beaten by the Green Party candidate.

Election results

2009 election

References

St Ives, Cornwall
Electoral divisions of Cornwall Council